Adamstown Rosebud Football Club is an Australian semi-professional association football club based in Adamstown, Newcastle. Founded on 12 July 1889, the club was one of the oldest Australian clubs to become professional (in 1984).

Players can be called up to represent their national team in a senior international match; a total of 13 players have won at least one cap for their country in senior international football while playing for Adamstown Rosebud. In June 1922, Peter Doyle became the first Adamstown Rosebud player to be capped when he appeared for Australia's first international match against New Zealand.

List of internationals
 Key
 Players are initially arranged by alphabetical order of surname.
 Appearances as a substitute are included.
 International years indicates the year of the player's first and last caps while an Adamstown Rosebud player. Caps included are for the number won by the player during his time with Adamstown Rosebud.

Notes

References
Specific

General

Internationals
Adamstown Rosebud Internationals
Association football player non-biographical articles
Adamstown Rosebud